Ikra is a rural locality (a selo) and the administrative centre of Ikrinsky Selsoviet, Kurakhsky District, Republic of Dagestan, Russia. The population was 1,618 as of 2010. There are 16 streets.

Geography 
Ikra is located 23 km southwest of Kurakh (the district's administrative centre) by road, on the Kurakh River. Kabir and Kutul are the nearest rural localities.

Nationalities 
Lezgins live there.

Famous residents 
 Esed Salikhov (Hero of the Soviet Union)
 Zeynudin Batmanaov (Hero of Russia)

References 

Rural localities in Kurakhsky District